Curt Malawsky (born May 10, 1970 in Coquitlam, British Columbia) is a former box lacrosse player and currently the Assistant General Manager and Head Coach of the Calgary Roughnecks of the National Lacrosse League. Malawsky played for eleven seasons in the NLL and appeared in five Champion's Cup finals, three with Rochester, one with Arizona, and finally winning the title with Calgary in his final season in 2009. He was inducted into the Canadian Lacrosse Hall of Fame as a box player in 2015. In 2022, he was inducted into the Coquitlam Sports Hall of Fame.

Malawsky is also the coach of the Coquitlam Adanacs Jr. A lacrosse team.  He led the Adanacs to the BC Junior A Lacrosse League title and won the Minto Cup national championship in 2010, for which he was named the British Columbia Lacrosse Association's Coach of the Year.

His brother Derek also plays in the NLL, and the two played together in Rochester, San Jose, and in Arizona.

Statistics

NLL

References

1970 births
Living people
National Lacrosse League coaches
Calgary Roughnecks players
Arizona Sting players
San Jose Stealth players
Rochester Knighthawks players
Canadian lacrosse players
Sportspeople from British Columbia
People from Coquitlam
Calgary Roughnecks coaches